Norman P. Gonzales (born May 21, 1976) is a Filipino former professional basketball player. He was drafted seventh overall by Mobiline in the 2001 PBA Draft.

Professional career
Gonzales is among the league’s toughest sixth man since he entered the league in 2001. He was known for producing big points, sometimes double-double during his amateur days and while he was playing in the defunct MBA, a regional-based professional league in the Philippines when he played in the two MBA teams, the Pampanga Dragons (he was part of the championship team) and the Cagayan de Oro Amigos. Known also as a good defensive stopper inside and outside, Gonzales spent his first two years with Talk 'N Text. In 2003, he was suspended for failing a random drug test, and along with 5 other players filed a lawsuit with the league attempting to regain playing status. He later signed up as a free agent with Sta. Lucia. Gonzales proved his innocence and continuously improved his game especially when Sta. Lucia team governor Buddy Encarnado gave him another chance to redeem his sinking career in 2004.

Coca-Cola Tigers
On August 27, 2009, he was signed by the Coca-Cola Tigers as a free agent where he became one of their reliable role players.

Rain or Shine Elasto Painters
He along with J.R. Quiñahan and two future draft picks were traded to the Rain or Shine Elasto Painters for Doug Kramer and Josh Vanlandingham. However, he was not given a contract and was released days after.

Saigon Heat
After a short stint with the San Miguel Beermen at the beginning of the 2013 ABL season, Gonzales joined the Saigon Heat with only a handful of games left in the same season.

Blackwater Sports
He was picked up by Blackwater Sports in 2014 PBA Expansion Draft.

National Team
Gonzales represented the national team in the 2005 Southeast Asian Games, where the team won gold.

References

External links
Player Profile
PBA-Online! Profile

1976 births
Living people
San Beda Red Lions basketball players
Kapampangan people
Philippines men's national basketball team players
Filipino men's basketball players
Saigon Heat players
TNT Tropang Giga players
Basketball players from Pampanga
Small forwards
Power forwards (basketball)
Sta. Lucia Realtors players
Powerade Tigers players
Filipino expatriate basketball people in Singapore
Filipino expatriate basketball people in Vietnam
Maharlika Pilipinas Basketball League players
TNT Tropang Giga draft picks
Southeast Asian Games gold medalists for the Philippines
Southeast Asian Games medalists in basketball